The Gospel Harmony Boys is a Southern gospel quartet. Since 1952, they have been presenting Gospel Music concerts all across the United States in churches, auditoriums, fairs, and festivals. The group presents a concert that includes many classic gospel songs as well as many new, original tunes that are designed to help us desire a closer walk with the Lord.

The Gospel Harmony Boys included Dr. Clacy Williams singing tenor, Scott Brooks singing lead, Scott Adams singing Baritone, and Henry Riffe singing bass.

References

External links
 Official website

Musical groups established in 1952
American gospel musical groups
Gospel quartets
Southern gospel performers
1952 establishments in the United States